The Debut Prize is an award for young authors of literary works in the Russian language.  

Established in 2000 by the International Pokolenie (Generation) Foundation, the prize is awarded annually in five to seven categories reflecting the major fiction genres. 

In 2012, the Debut Prize winners toured the eastern USA and participated in the Festival of Russian Arts in New York.

History
The Debut Prize was first awarded in 2000, with financial support from  Andrei Skoch. At that time the maximum age of the winners was 25 years. In 2011, however, the threshold was changed, and now the prize can be awarded to authors who are under the age of 35 at the time of award.

During the first five years of the "Debut", more than 170,000 manuscripts were submitted from Russia, many European countries, former members of the Soviet Bloc, the United States, Israel, Australia and Japan. In 2007, the  "Young Russian world" prize was created for writers living outside the Russian Federation (regardless of nationality).

Selection of the winners 

Writers may be nominated by publishers, the media, literary organizations, or the authors themselves. Tens of thousands of texts are nominated each year. After the texts are read in e-reader form by literary experts, a "long list" of recommended candidates with a brief annotation of each work is sent to be read by a jury composed of five to seven  writers, critics, editors and other members of the literary and cultural process. The composition of the jury changes each year.

Based on the long list, the jury forms a short list of three to four works in each category. The jury then conducts weekly creative workshops with the finalists.  On the evening before the awards are announced the jury holds a closed session to determine the winners in all categories.

The announcement of winners and presentation of awards takes place at a reception in December of each year.

The prize 

Winners in all categories receive a "Bird" award, and a publishing contract with the Pokolenie Foundation worth one million rubles. Works of the winners and finalists of the Debut Prize are published annually in collections and individual books. The winners in all categories receive publication fees, and those on the "short list" get 20 author copies.

Winners

2000
"Large-prose." Sergei Sakin and Pavel Teterskii for the story "Big Ben (Russian surprise for the Queen Mum)"
"Small prose." Danila Davydov for a book of short stories "Experiments cruelty."
"Large-scale poetic form." Catherine Boyarskikh for the poem "Echo of women."
"Small poetic form." Cyril Reshetnikov for a series of poems.
"Drama." Vasily Sigarev for the play "Clay."

2001
"Large-prose." Sergei Shargunov for the novel "The Kid punished."
"Small prose." Denis Osokin for a series of short stories "Angels and Revolution."
"Poetry." Natalia Starodubtseva for a series of poems.
"Drama." Svetlana Savina for the play "The violin and a little nervous."
"Humor in the literature." Anastasia Kopman for a series of ironic miniatures.

2002
"Large-prose." Anatoly Ryasov for his novel "Three of hell."
"Small prose." Dean Gatina per cycle of miniatures "Hot Countries" and "attraction".
"Poetry." Paul Kolpakov for a series of poems.
"Drama." Sergei Kaluzhanov for the play "Sooner or later."
"Literature for children." Anna Russ for the selection of poems.

2003
"Large-prose." Vladimir Lorchenkov for his novel "Hora Shootout."
"Small prose." Nicholas Epihin for the selection of stories.
"Poetry". Marianne Heiden for a series of poems.
"Drama." Ksenia Zhukova for the play "by accident."
"Fantastic." Alexander force behind the story "Army Gutentaka."

2004
"Large-prose." Alexander Grishchenko for the story "backwards."
"Small prose." Oleg Zobern for the selection of stories.
"Poetry." Anna Logvinova a cycle of poems "in the bosom of the Soviet coat."
"Drama." Zlata Demina for the play "God loves."
"Literary criticism and essays." Julia Idlis for the selection of book reviews and essays.

2005
"Large-prose." Dmitry Faleev for the novel "Cold beer on a sunny afternoon"
"Small prose." Alexander Snegirev for the selection of stories
"Poetry." Alla Gorbunova for the selection of poems
"Drama." Alexander Gritsenko for the play "carriers"
"The film story" Anastasia Cech for the script "Otlichnitsa"
"Journalism" Dmitry Biryukov for the selection of articles
"The literature of spiritual search" Andrew Nitchenko for the selection of poems

2006
"Large-prose." Victor Tufts for his story "diabetes."
"Small prose." Daria Tagil for the selection of stories.
"Poetry." Marina Mursalova for the selection of poems.
"Drama." Nicholas Sredin for the play "The stars in the sand."
"Literary criticism and essays." Valeria Pustovaya for a collection of essays, reviews, and essays.
"Literature for Children". Vadim Celine for the story "At Home in the board! How to learn to ride a skateboard. "

2007
"Large-prose." Stanislav Burkin for the novel "on the bank of the Tom Faun."
"Small prose." Irina Glebova for the selection of stories.
"Poetry." Vladimir Kochnev for the selection of poems.
"Dramatic". Valery Pecheykin for the play "Falcons".
"Fantastic." Olga Onoyko for his novel "surgery."
"Young Russian world" First Prize: Dmitry Vachedin (Mainz, Germany) for his story "The Rifleman azure sky"; Second prize: Valery Pecheykin (Tashkent, Uzbekistan) for the play "Falcons"; Third Prize: Alexander Mortgage (Odessa, Ukraine) for the play "Travel."

2008
"Large-prose." Sergei Krasilnikov for the novel "Blood Bitch".
"Small prose." Michael Coons for the selection of stories.
"Poetry." Andrei Egorov for the selection of poems.
"Drama." Yaroslav Pulinovich for the play "Natasha's Dream."
"Literary criticism and essays." Alexander Montlevich for his essay "Criminology presence"
"Screenplay." Daria Gratsevich for the script "touchy."
"Young Russian world": First Prize: Sergey Krasilnikov (Daugavpils, Latvia) for the novel "Blood Bitch"; Second Prize: Daniel Benditskiy (Berlin, Germany) for a compilation of short stories, and the third prize: Oksana Barysheva (Almaty, Kazakhstan) for documentary story "on this and that side Ryskulov."

2009
"Large-prose." Gulla Hirachev ( Alisa Ganieva ) for her story "Salam, Dalgat!».
"Small prose." Pauline Klyukina for the selection of stories.
"Poetry." Ekaterina Sokolova for the selection of poems.
"Drama." Anne Buchanan for his play "Frontovichka."
"Essays." Eugene Tabachnikov essay for "Generation" I ""

2010
"Large-prose." Olga Rimsha for the novel "Still Water".
"Small prose." Anna Geraskina for the story, "I can not hear you."
"Poetry." Alex Afonin a poem from the book "Water and time."
"Drama." Maria Zielinska for the play "Do you hear?"
"Essays." Tatiana Mazepina for an essay "A Journey to the side of paradise. In Egypt, on the ground. "

2011

"Large-prose." Vladislav Beekeeper for the story "Mode."
"Little Prose" Edward Lukoyanov for the selection of stories.
"Poetry." Andrew Bowman for the book "Tysyacheletnik."
"Drama." Ekaterina Vasilyeva for the play "You were my", "Love me greatly," "One day we'll all be happy."
"Essays." Marianne ions as the product "Residents gardens."
"Fantastic." Anna Leonidova for the novel "Before I die."

2012
"Large-prose." Ilia Pankratov for the story "Slonodemiya."
"Little Prose" Eugene Grandma for a series of short stories, "Winter's Tale."
"Poetry". Alexei Porvin for the selection of poems.
"Dramatic". Xenia Stepanycheva for the play "The Rape".
"Essays." Elena Pogorelaya for the selection of critical articles.
"Fantastic." Dmitry Kolodan for the story and the cycle of short stories "The time Jabberwocky."
"Special film prize". Maxim Matkovsky for a series of short stories, "Dancing with the pigs."
Under the "Debut" special premiums and prizes, meet the urgent tasks of the literary process.

Books published as a result of the Debut Prize

2000 
Anton Friedland. smell chess. Novel, Metro. Story. - Moscow LLC "Publishing ACT" 2001. Novel "The Smell of chess" - a stylish smart detective. The book also includes a new story by Anton Friedland "Metro".
"Clay." Prose, drama.  - Moscow LLC "Publishing ACT" 2001.
The collection "Plasticine" includes prose and drama winners and finalists "Debut 2000". Danila Davydov, Sergei Sakin, Kira Lascaris, Oksana Ephraim, Anton Jankowski, Zalina Hadikova Sergei Kaluzhanov, Michael Pokrass, Basil cigars.
"The density of expectations." Collection of poetry.  - Moscow LLC "Publishing ACT" 2001. Poetry collection opens with two award winner: Catherine Boyarsky (nomination "Major poetic form", the poem "Echo Women") and Cyril Reshetnikov (nominated for "Small poetic form," Cycles of poems).

2001
"Two of the island." Collection of prose.  - Moscow: OGI, 2002. The book contains two stories: "The Kid punished" Sergei Shargunov and "Cradle of Death" Alexander Ostapenko. Sergei Shargunov for his novel was awarded the title of laureate "Debut" in "Major prose." Alexander Ostapenko entered the short-list "Debut-2001" in the same category.
"War and Peace - 2001." Prose, drama.  - Moscow: OGI, 2002. The collection includes works by the winners and finalists, "Debut-2001" in the nominations "Small prose", "Drama" and "Comedy in the literature." Denis Osokin, Arkady Babchenko, Aleksey Lukyanov, Vladimir Lorchenkov Anastasia Kopman, Alexander Silaev, Svetlana Savina, Sergei Kaluzhanov.
"Anatomy of an angel." Collection of poetry.  - Moscow: OGI, 2002. The book includes a selection of Natalia Starodubtseva, winner of the award in the category "Poetry", Jana Tokareva, Galina Zelenina, Dina Gatineau - finalists in the same category, and Anna Russ, which became a short-list of the category "Humour in literature."

2002
Anatoly Ryasov. "Three of Hell." Roman.  - M.: Publishing Elinina R., 2003. Author - winner of the "Debut" in 2002 in the category "Major Prose", Master of Oriental, an expert on the Middle East.
"Childhood of the century." Prose, drama.  - M.: Publishing Elinina R., 2003. The collection includes works by winners of "Debut" in 2002 in the category "Small Prose" (Dean Gatina) and "Drama" (Sergey Kaluzhanov), works of the finalists of the nominations (George Avdoshin Svetlana Est, Alexander Arkhipov, Andrew Kureichik) and fiction finalists "floating category" 2002 "Literature for Children" (Olesya Artemov, Olga Pakhomov).
«XXI poet. Shot event. " Collected Poems.  - M.: Publishing Elinina R., 2003. A collection of award winners in the category "Poetry" (Paul Kolpakov) and "Books for Children" (Anna Russo). There is also published lists of finalists in the category "Poetry" (Victor Іvanіv, Julia idlis, Natalia Klyuchareva) young poets and poems included in the "long list" award.

2003
"Squaring the Circle". Story.  - M.: Light head, 2004. The book includes works by the winners and finalists of the Independent Literary Award *"Debut" in 2003, working in the major genres of prose: Vladimir Lorchenkov (winner in the category "Major Prose"), Andrey Ivanov (winner of the special prize of the Ministry of Culture of the Russian Federation "voice of a generation"), Alexander Silaeva (winner in the category "Science Fiction"), Adriana Samarkandovoy.
"Aldebaraki." Stories and plays.  - M.: Light head, 2004. The collection includes the works of ten young writers - the winners and finalists of the Independent Literary Award "Debut" in 2003 in the category "Small prose", "Drama", "literary criticism and essays."
"Brotherly cradle." Collection of poems.  - M.: Light head, 2004. Poetic anthology presents the works of winners and finalists of the Independent Literary Award "Debut" in 2003 in the category "Poetry". In addition, the collection includes poems authors of "generation" debut. "

2004
"The top of the iceberg." Story.  - M.: Light head, 2005. The book includes works, finalists in 2004 in the category "Large prose." Story "back" winner "Debut 2005" Sasha Gryshchenko novel "Pale city" Igor Saveliev, the story "The school psychiatrist" Stanislav Benecko.
"The Day of St. electrician." Short stories, plays and articles.  - M.: Light head, 2005. The collection consists of works by the winners and finalists of the Independent Literary Award "Debut" in 2004 in the category "Small prose", "Drama", "literary criticism."
"Insignia". Poetic anthology.  - M.: Light head, 2005. The anthology includes the best works of the contestants, the finalists and winners of the Independent Award "Debut" in "Poetry" for 2004. It came together not only representatives of the different versions of the mainstream, but the authors, dropping out of the "framework expectations."

2005
"Perimeter of happiness." Story.  - M.: Light head, 2006. The collection opens the story laureate "Debut" in 2005 by Dmitry Faleeva "cold beer on a sunny afternoon." The book also includes the story of finalists "Debut 2005" Ilmira Bolotyan, Mary Botev Marina Koshkin.
"Fifteen plus." Stories, plays, and essays.  - M.: Light head, 2006. The collection includes works by the winners and finalists, "Debut" in 2005 in the category "Small prose", "Drama", "Journalism".
"Changing the palette." Poetic anthology.  - M.: Light head, 2006. The collection includes works by the winners and finalists, "Debut" in 2006 in the category "Poetry", "Literature of spiritual quest."
Series "Millennium +" (books published up to "Debut" of different years)

2006
In late 2007, have been issued:

"Stars in the sand."  - M.: Light head, 2007. The collection includes works by the winners and finalists, "Debut" in 2007 in the category "Poetry", "Drama", "Small prose", "critic."
"The sixth quarter."  - M.: Light head, 2007. The collection includes works by the winners and finalists, "Debut" in 2007 in the category "Children's Literature."
"Prisoners of Hope."  - M.: Light head, 2007. The collection includes works by the winners and finalists, "Debut" in 2007 in the category "Large prose." (Authors - Andrew Skobelev Victor Tufts, Vladimir Danihnov).

Other
In 2007, the publishing house "ACT" in the publishing of the "Debut" was a book of some nominees for the "Debut" of different years, clearly currently declared, but not become winners:
Julia Bakirova "Killer Advertising"
Alexander Mortgage "Where our hearts"
Alex Frolov, "Mother-jan"
Andrei Simonov "Cairo International"
Paul Costin "Runner"
Andrew Kuzechkin "Mendeleev-rock"

References

External links

Russian literary awards
Russian-language literary awards
Awards established in 2000